William Hulme's Grammar School is a mixed all-through school in Whalley Range, Manchester, England.

History
William Hulme (1631–1691) of Hulme Hall, Stockport, was the founder of "Hulme's Charity" later known as the Hulme Trust. Following the premature death of his son, he left provision for the foundation of exhibitions for four students to study for Bachelor of Arts degrees at Brasenose College in Oxford. The income for this charity was originally £64, which came from rents and dues on his many outlying properties. Over the years, this sum grew so much that on several occasions it was necessary to extend the scope of his bequest. In 1881, the Trustees of his charity were empowered to build schools in Manchester, Oldham and Bury.

The Manchester school was founded on 26 January 1887 as a grammar school. Originally named The Hulme Grammar School, in 1939 it changed its name to William Hulme's Grammar School. Until 1975 it was a direct grant school; when this scheme was abolished, it chose to become independent.

In 2006, the school announced that it was joining the state sector, abolishing all tuition fees and selection. It applied for and gained academy status, making it more independent than most state schools by allowing for the selection of up to 10% of students based on aptitude in foreign languages. It is the first member of the Headmasters' and Headmistresses' Conference of top independent schools to opt into the state sector.

In 2007, the school announced that plans to become an Academy had been finalised and that the United Learning Trust had signed the contract. Plans for extensive building work were revealed, backed by a £10 million investment. Building work, which involved a complete renovation and extension of the Donner Block and the demolition of the Art and Design building, was completed within 2 years.

In 2014, the school announced an extension to expand its capacity, including a new Preparatory building. An annual intake of 150 students was to begin from the 2015–2016 academic year.

Buildings

Old Building

The original part of the school was designed by A. H. Davies-Colley in 1886–1887 as a large, high (up to four storeys) building of red brick and yellow terracotta. There is a hall of c.1910 in the same style. Both buildings are symmetrical. The building lies on top of a large tunnel network. In the original building, there is a ground floor hall surrounded by balconies on many levels. The main staircase is opposed by large stained glass windows. The basement level was refurbished on one side in 2007 in order to allow lessons to be held in two small classrooms. At the front of the school in the basement are the staff changing rooms and medical centre.

The stage of the main hall lies opposite the hall entrance, above which are a number of oil paintings of previous headmasters. A portrait of Patriarca was commissioned in 2008. Around the oak-panelled walls of the hall are boards bearing the names of old boys who have been awarded Scholarships or Exhibitions to Oxford or Cambridge, long serving teachers and all past headmasters. Above these are numerous house flags and shields. On the west wall is the stage staff balcony. Beneath the balcony is the organ. There is also a fairly new grand piano which is frequently used for public concerts and recitals. Beneath the main hall was originally the changing rooms but is now the music department which is equipped with an older grand piano in the rehearsal studio, along with several upright pianos and a number of computers and keyboards.

Science Block
Leaving the old building from the back, one enters the north quad. Opposite is the science block, which was built in 1927. It houses approximately 10 Physics, Chemistry, Biology and Geology laboratories and also classrooms for Sports Science, Economics and Business Studies, along with the Activities Studio. There are darkroom facilities within the physics department. It has been extended twice. The first extension, in the 1940s, added 4 labs at the north end of the building. Its purpose, according to the Headmaster at the time, was to "prosecute study and further the development of truth; if that can't be done, what else is there?" The second extension was in January 1985. The gap at the back between the then-Donner library and the 'old' biology laboratory was filled to give a new biology lab and a multi-purpose large lab. The latter of these was refurbished in 2002 as the Dr Barnes Laboratory, in memory of Dr David Barnes, head of physics, who died suddenly whilst training in 2000.

Donner Block
On the other side of the north quad is the Donner block, named after Sir Edward Donner, a benefactor of the school. It was built as an extension to the technology building in the mid 20th century. In 2007/8 it was completely gutted and rebuilt. The new building includes the dining hall, most of the central offices for the Secondary Phase and classrooms for the Mathematics, History, Geography, Religious Studies, Food Technology, Art and Design Technology departments, as well as staff and sixth form common rooms.

South Quad
On the other side of the Donner Block is the south quad. This is surrounded by the Donner Block, the Learning Resources Centre (library), the Performing Arts Centre (PAC) and the Zochonis Centre.

Zochonis Centre
The Zochonis Centre contains the English, Modern Foreign Languages, Latin, Classics, EAL, ICT and Learning Support Departments.

Learning Resources Centre
The Donner Library, now renamed the Learning Resources Centre moved to the previous VIth form common room in 2007. This is its third location - it has previously occupied what is now the Mathematics department and the Donner block first floor. The old Junior Library was housed in the basement of the old building underneath room 7, in what is now the CCF stores

Sports facilities
Behind the academic buildings, and backing onto Princess Road are the sports facilities. There is a sports hall with full cricket nets, gymnasium and changing rooms as well as a more modern pavilion/changing room suite. A full-size AstroTurf pitch with adjacent netball courts was built in 2002–2003. In winter the playing fields are used for hockey, rugby and soccer pitches, and in summer for rounders and cricket pitches. Badminton, basketball and tennis are also played.  Throughout the year there are regular inter-school and inter-House matches in all the main sports. The Corps also has an indoor rifle range on the campus.

Harris House, Hardraw
The school, through the J.G. Bird Trust, owned a former school and attached headmaster's house in the village of Hardraw, near Hawes, Wensleydale. School parties frequented this listed building, known as Harris House, to take part in outdoor pursuits. Built in 1875, it closed as a school in the 1960s and was bought by WHGS, which at the time owned several centres similar to but smaller than this. The centre was known as Hulme House until 1993, when W. C. Harris, an Old Hulmeian, left £50,000 in his will for the renovation of the property. The house was then renamed after its principal benefactor. Harris House has now been sold.

School life

House system
The House system had operated for more than 100 years until recent changes that reduced their number from six to four. In 2020, the houses were further changed to better reflect the diversity within the school. The House Masters are all senior staff.  Heads of House and House Prefects are elected annually. House artefacts, namely shields, banners and portraits, can be seen at the school in the New Hall.

Origins of Houses
The Houses in the old system were named after influential Mancunians:

 Byrom - John Byrom, Poet
 Dalton - John Dalton, Physicist
 Fraser - James Fraser, reforming Anglican Bishop of Manchester
 Gaskell - Elizabeth Gaskell, Author
 Heywood - Oliver Heywood, Banker and philanthropist
 Whitworth- Sir Joseph Whitworth, Engineer

The 2002 houses were named after influential Hulmeians/benefactors:

 Bonnick - WHGS Teacher, 1940s-1990s
 Hulme -  William Hulme, founder
 Jones - Samuel Jones, Old Hulmeian, donor of first of the School's shields, for the form football competition.
 Roberts - William Roberts, benefactor. Resident of Whalley Range who donated £2000 in 1899, which was used to extend the School's grounds.

The 2020 houses were named after Mancunians of diverse race, gender and sexuality to better reflect the diversity within the school.

 Johnson - Len Johnson, boxer and civil rights activist
 Pankhurst - Emmeline Pankhurst, suffragette
 Turing - Alan Turing, mathematician, computer scientist and code-breaker
 Bell - Dr Erinma Bell, peace activist

Combined Cadet Force
Towards the end of their second year (Year 8), the dwindling majority of pupils will join the voluntary CCF (the "Corps"). Uniform is issued and cadets accompany the Contingent on a Field Day in June and, if they wish, Summer Camp, where they take part in a wide variety of activities. They train once a week at School, following  syllabuses which lead to promotion and qualifications.

Cadets join either the Army (Duke of Lancaster's Regiment) or the RAF Section, which is currently non-operational, both of which are officered by teachers, whereafter a minimum of five terms' service is expected. They may then choose to continue as NCOs in the Sixth Form, during which time they undergo more advanced training and assist in instructing the younger cadets. The Corps meets weekly and takes part in a Field Day each term. In addition to Summer Camps, there are two camps at Easter, one on an RAF Station, the other adventurous training in North Wales.

Music
A concert band/orchestra exists and plays in several concerts each year along with the choir, jazz band and samba band.

Sports

Weekly fixtures are played against other local schools and also more prestigious clubs; for example, the cricket 1st XI have an annual fixture vs. the MCC.

Notable former pupils

 Andrew Bennett, former Labour MP for Denton
 Claude Blair, museum curator 
 Kim Booth, politician
 Peter Butterworth, actor
 John Doyle, drummer with Magazine
 Anthony Dyson, Anglican priest and academic
 Leslie Haden-Guest, 1st Baron Haden-Guest, doctor and Labour MP
 James Hickman, swimmer
 Michael Platt, rugby league player 
 Andy Hinchcliffe, footballer
 Derek Leckenby (1943–1994), lead guitarist of Herman's Hermits
 John Lee, Baron Lee of Trafford, Conservative MP and Liberal Democrat politician
 Ivan Lewis, MP for Bury South since 1997 and former Minister.
 Michael Lord, Baron Framlingham, Second Deputy Chairman of Ways and Means and Conservative MP
 Sir Robert Mark, Commissioner of the Metropolitan Police
 Jeremy McMullen, judge, trade unionist and expert on employment law
 Reuben Singh, entrepreneur
 Colin Touchin, conductor, composer and music educator
 Ashley Ward, footballer
 Thomas William Warnes, gastroenterologist
 John Haggie, Newfoundland health minister
 Ravi Apnabeat, DJ & Entertainer

See also

Listed buildings in Manchester-M16
 William Hulme
 Hulme Trust
 Hulme Grammar School, Oldham

References

Further reading 
 K.P. Thompson, The History of William Hulme's Grammar School, 1887–1980

External links
 

Academies in Manchester
Primary schools in Manchester
Secondary schools in Manchester
 01
Educational institutions established in 1887
1887 establishments in England
United Learning schools
Hulme Trust